Mikhail Abramovitch Morozov (19 August 1870 - 24 October 1903) was a Russian businessman, arts patron and collector. He was the eldest son of Abram Abramovitch Morozov, the elder brother of the collector Ivan Morozov (1871-1921) and the husband of the art collector Margarita Morozova (1873-1958).

Life 

The Morozov family were Old Believers, who often gave biblical names to their children, and belonged to the first guild of merchants.

His father Abram had been born to a family of Old Believers, who often gave biblical names to their children. The Morozov family belonged to the first guild of merchants. Abram left the Old Believers during his engagement to an Orthodox woman, but later converted to an Old Ritualist joined with the Russian Orthodox Church. Mikhail was baptised on 12 August at an Old Ritualist church near the Saltykov bridge on the Iaouza. His younger brother Ivan became a textile manufacturer and a major art collector who discovered Picasso, whilst another younger brother Arsène (1874-1908) was dandy passionate about hunting and took no part in business.

After dividing up the Morozov family's lands and goods, Abram and his brother David co-president-directors of the Tver Manufacture Company in 1872. His wife Varvara Alexeïevna (née Khloudova, 1848–1917) also helped manage the business. From 1877 he suffered from psychomotor disorders, possibly 'Bayle's disease' or general paralysis.

References

Bibliography 
  Anne Baldassari, La collection Morozov : Icônes de l'Art moderne, Gallimard, 2021, 440 p. (ISBN 978-2-0729-0458-5)
  Natalia Semenova and Michèle Kahn (translation), Les Frères Morozov, Actes Sud, 2021, 320 p. (ISBN 978-2-3301-3959-9)
 Site on Ivan Abramovitch Morozov

1870 births
1903 deaths
People from Moscow
Russian art collectors
Russian Impressionist painters
Russian businesspeople